Metam sodium is an organosulfur compound with the formula .  The compound is a sodium salt of a dithiocarbamate.  The compound exists as a colorless dihydrate, but most commonly it is encountered as an aqueous solution. It is used as a soil fumigant, pesticide, herbicide, and fungicide. It is one of the most widely used pesticides in the United States, with approximately 60 million pounds used in 2001.

Preparation and properties
Metam sodium is prepared by combining methylamine, carbon disulfide, and sodium hydroxide:

It also arises from the reaction of methyl isothiocyanate and sodium thiolate.

Upon exposure to the environment, metam sodium decomposes to methyl isothiocyanate.

Safety and environmental considerations
Metam sodium is nonpersistent in the environment since it is prone to hydrolysis.  The degradation products, carbon disulfide and methyl amine are however toxic. In 1991 a tank car with 19,000 gallons of metam sodium spilled into Sacramento River above Lake Shasta. This killed all fish in a 41-mile stretch of the river. By 20 years later the rainbow trout population had recovered.

See also 
 Zineb - A related dithiocarbamate salt which is also used as a fungicide

References

External links
 

Pesticides
Herbicides
Fungicides
Dithiocarbamates
Organic sodium salts